China National Highway 309 (G309) runs west from Rongcheng, Shandong towards Hebei Province, Shanxi Province, Shaanxi Province, Ningxia Autonomous Region, and ends in Lanzhou, Gansu. It is 2208 kilometres in length.

Route and distance

See also
 China National Highways

References

Transport in Gansu
Transport in Shandong
Transport in Shanxi
Transport in Shaanxi
Transport in Hebei
Transport in Ningxia
309